In July 2020, Ireland was scheduled to play a two-test series against Australia as part of the 2020 July rugby union tests; however, due to the COVID-19 pandemic, the tour was postponed on 15 May.		
 The scheduled series was to occur two years after Ireland previously toured Australia, with the visiting side winning that series 2–1, the first time Ireland had won a series in Australia since 1979. This series was to be Andy Farrell's first overseas tour since becoming Ireland's head coach, as well as new Australia head coach Dave Rennie's first in charge since he took over from Michael Cheika.

Fixtures

Squads
Note: Ages, caps and clubs are as per 4 July, the first test match of the tour.

Ireland

Coaching team:
 Head coach:  Andy Farrell
 Assistant coach:  Mike Catt
 Forwards coach:  Simon Easterby
 Scrum coach:  John Fogarty

Australia

See also
 2020 July rugby union tests
 History of rugby union matches between Australia and Ireland

References

2019–20 in Irish rugby union
2020 in Australian rugby union
2020 rugby union tours
2020
2020
Rugby union events postponed due to the COVID-19 pandemic